Fichot is a French surname. Notable people with the surname include:

 Eugène Fichot (1867–1939), French hydrographer and geodesist
 Léon Fichot (1906–1992), French racing cyclist

French-language surnames